Robert Rithe was MP for Petersfield from  1571 to 1572.

References

People from Petersfield
English MPs 1571